Ashoroa (named after its type locality Ashoro, Hokkaido) is an extinct genus of desmostylian, aquatic, herbivorous mammal.  Fossils of Ashoroa have been found in the Morawan Formation on Hokkaido, Japan (paleocoordinates ) and were dated to the late Oligocene.

Description
 
It is known from a rib, a humerus, a femur, and three vertebrae of the single species and holotype, Ashoroa laticosta.

Ashoroa had pachyosteosclerotic (large and dense) bones.  The ribs are broader than in other desmostylians, similar to sirenian ribs, and very dense, like those of Behemotops and Paleoparadoxia; and extant, semi-aquatic mammals such as Eurasian beaver and hippopotamus, but not as dense as in sirenians.  The recovered long bones lack inner cavities, like in Paleoparadoxia and Desmostylus, and the trabecular pattern is different from that in Behemotops.

 interpreted Ashoroa, together with Behemotops and Paleoparadoxia. as a "shallow water swimmer, either hovering slowly at a preferred depth, or walking on the bottom".

References

Bibliography 

 
 

Desmostylians
Chattian life
Prehistoric placental genera
Oligocene mammals of Asia
Fossils of Japan
Fossil taxa described in 2000